Angul Airport, also called Savitri Jindal Airport  is a private airport owned by Jindal Steel and Power under DGCA license and located at Angul in the Angul district of Odisha, India. The airport is named after the Jindal group businesswoman and the richest woman in India, Savitri Jindal. The nearest airfield is Phulbani Airstrip in Phulbani, Odisha.

References

Airports in Odisha
Angul district
Airports with year of establishment missing